Rimavská Seč is a village and municipality with approx. 1,900, predominantly Hungarian inhabitants in the Rimavská Sobota District of the Banská Bystrica Region of southern Slovakia.

External links

http://www.statistics.sk/mosmis/eng/run.html

Villages and municipalities in Rimavská Sobota District
Hungarian communities in Slovakia